Homodiaetus is a genus of pencil catfishes native to South America.

Species
There are currently four recognized species in this genus:
 Homodiaetus anisitsi Eigenmann & Ward, 1907
 Homodiaetus banguela Koch, 2002
 Homodiaetus graciosa Koch, 2002
 Homodiaetus passarellii (Miranda-Ribeiro, 1944)

Distribution
The distribution of Homodiaetus is restricted you southeastern South America, from Uruguay to Paraguay Rivers in the west to the coastal drainages of the Rio de Janeiro State, Brazil. H. anisitsi originates from the Paraná-Paraguay River basin. H. banguela inhabits the São João River and H. passarellii is known from coastal basins in the State of Rio de Janeiro. H. graciosa is distributed in coastal basins of southeastern Brazil in states of Paraná and São Paulo.

Description
Homodiaetus is currently distinguished from other genera of Stegophilinae by the combination of the origin of the pelvic fin midlength between the tip of the snout and the caudal-fin origin, the opercle with three or more odontodes, and the gill membranes confluent with the isthmus. Homodiaetus species are small and grow up to 42 millimetres (1.7 in) SL. They are transparent with the except of the head and abdomen. Homodiaetus species have a thin body and depressed head that is almost as wide as the head is long. The dorsal and ventral profiles are straight except for a convex head. The mouth is inferior.

H. anisitsi has three dark bands on its caudal fin, while dark lines are irregular or absent in the other three species. Among the other three species, H. graciosa has 5–6 rows of teeth in the dentary (vs. 6–7 in the other two species). H. graciosa has 7–9 (usually 8) opercular odontodes, H. passarellii has 6–7, and H. banguella has 9.

Ecology
Homodiaetus species are found in lagoons and arenaceous rivers of little depth. These fish are known to be lepidophagous, meaning they feed upon scales.

References

Trichomycteridae
Fish of South America
Fauna of Brazil
Freshwater fish genera
Catfish genera
Taxa named by Carl H. Eigenmann